Vieux Carré Property Owners, Residents, and Associates ( VCPORA ), organized in the 1920s, is a pioneer organization in the historic preservation movement that grew out of several grass roots efforts to protect the 200-year-old Vieux Carré from decay and demolition.  In 1936 the Louisiana state legislature passed a constitutional amendment authorizing the historic preservation of the Vieux Carré. Two years later on June 8, 1938 the neighborhood organization incorporated as a non-profit dedicated to the preservation, restoration, beautification and general betterment of the Vieux Carré.

The Vieux Carré is commonly known as the New Orleans, Louisiana's French Quarter district and is the site of the French Colony established in 1718.

VCPORA's affiliate memberships include the National Trust for Historic Preservation, the Louisiana Landmarks Society, and the Preservation Resource Center of New Orleans

References

External links
 VCPORA.org

  Records of preservation work on file at Earl K. Long Library, University of New Orleans
Vieux Carré Riverfront Expressway The freeway that would have cut through the historic Vieux Carré.
Vieux Carre Historic District
 French Quarter Citizens

Neighborhoods in New Orleans

Historic districts on the National Register of Historic Places in Louisiana
National Register of Historic Places in New Orleans